Maurizio Liverani (27 November 1928 – 10 February 2021), also known as Mauro Lirani or even Ivanovich Koba, was an Italian journalist, filmmaker, and writer. He was born in Rovereto and died in Senigallia.

Filmography

Director 
 Sai cosa faceva Stalin alle donne? (1969)
 Il solco di pesca (1976)
 Se questa è follia... (1993), documentary
 La strategia del bianco (1994), documentary
 Ben Shahn: un tragico umorista (1995), documentary
 I colori di Sara (1997), documentary
 Gli eroi sono stanchi - I gessi di Enrico Mazzolani (1998), documentary

Screenwriter 
 Sai cosa faceva Stalin alle donne? (1969)
 Il solco di pesca (1975)
 Se questa è follia... (1993), documentary
 La strategia del bianco (1994), documentary
 Ben Shahn: un tragico umorista (1995), documentary
 I colori di Sara (1997), documentary
 Gli eroi sono stanchi - I gessi di Enrico Mazzolani (1998), documentary

References

1928 births
2021 deaths
Italian journalists
Italian directors
Italian writers
People from Rovereto